The National Wrestling Alliance was a professional wrestling stable who competed in the World Wrestling Federation (WWF) in 1998 and was led by Jim Cornette. Most members of the stable were alumni of Jim Crockett Promotions, once a prominent member of the NWA before selling most assets to Turner Broadcasting, which became the basis of World Championship Wrestling (WCW).

History 
On December 30, 1997 (shown January 5, 1998), Jim Cornette brought NWA promoters/officials Howard Brody and Dennis Coralluzzo to WWF Raw is War and made a match between Jeff Jarrett and Barry Windham for the vacant NWA North American Heavyweight Championship. Jarrett defeated Windham to win the title after Cornette interfered. On January 12, 1998, The Rock 'n' Roll Express debuted and joined Cornette and Jarrett. The Rock 'n' Roll Express were awarded the NWA World Tag Team Championship and successfully defended the titles from The Disciples of Apocalypse by losing by disqualification on the January 12 Raw. At the 1998 Royal Rumble, Jarrett entered the Royal Rumble at #18, but was eliminated a minute later by Owen Hart. The following night on the January 19 Raw, Jarrett successfully defended the North American Championship against Blackjack Bradshaw. After the match, Blackjack Windham turned on Bradshaw and joined the NWA.

By February 1998, Jarrett and Windham began to feud with Bradshaw while The Rock 'n' Roll Express began to feud with The Headbangers. At No Way Out 1998, Bradshaw defeated Jarrett by disqualification. Two days later on February 17, The Rock 'n' Roll Express lost the NWA World Tag Team Championship to The Headbangers. In March, the NWA lineup changed as Jarrett left the group on March 2 and reverted to his "Double J" persona and vacated the North American Championship. Cornette then awarded the vacated title to Windham, but the NWA stripped Windham of the belt just one day later. On March 17, 1998, after The Rock 'n' Roll Express failed to win the NWA Tag Team Championship from The Headbangers, they were kicked out of the stable after Cornette's new team The Midnight Express (Bombastic Bob and Bodacious Bart) attacked them. At WrestleMania XIV, the Midnight Express appeared at the 15 team battle royal and finished as the runners up. Barry Windham also appeared during the match and eliminated Bradshaw's partner Chainz, thus costing Bradshaw the match. The following night on the March 30 Raw Is WAR, The Midnight Express defeated the Headbangers to win the NWA World Tag Team Championship. After the match, NWA World Heavyweight Champion Dan Severn debuted and joined the NWA by attacking the Headbangers.

After winning the titles, The Midnight Express feuded with The Rock 'n' Roll Express over the titles throughout April with the Midnights coming out on top in every encounter, most notably at Unforgiven: In Your House. By May, the group began to shrink as Barry Windham left the WWF for WCW and Severn went on his own in the WWF. The NWA's last hurrah occurred at the 1998 King of the Ring where they challenged The New Age Outlaws for the WWF Tag Team Championship, but lost. On August 14, 1998, the Midnight Express lost the NWA World Tag Team Championship to The Border Patrol at an NWA event. After the title loss, Cornette broke the NWA stable up on orders from WWF owner Vince McMahon, who told Cornette that he was banning anymore NWA matches from taking place on his shows.

Members

Championships and accomplishments
World Wrestling Federation
NWA North American Heavyweight Championship (2 times) – Jeff Jarrett (1) and Barry Windham (1)
NWA World Heavyweight Championship (1 time) – Dan Severn
NWA World Tag Team Championship (2 times) – The Rock 'n' Roll Express (1) and The Midnight Express (1)

References

National Wrestling Alliance
WWE teams and stables